Marshall Place is a prominent street in the Scottish city of Perth, Perth and Kinross.

The street is named for Thomas Hay Marshall, twice lord provost of Perth in the early 19th century. Marshall and his father-in-law, Thomas Anderson (owner of the former Blackfriars lands), who were responsible for the construction of much of Georgian Perth, made the first steps in the creation of Tay Street in the late 18th century when they constructed Atholl Crescent and Atholl Street in the north and Marshall Place in the south. Marshall Place is now lined with townhouses built to take advantage of the view of the South Inch, of which it forms part of the northern boundary.

Notable locations 

 St Leonard's-in-the-Fields Church (Category A listed building)
 Statue of Sir Walter Scott (Category C listed building)
 1–14 Marshall Place (Category B listed buildings)
 15–28 Marshall Place (Category B listed buildings)

Junctions 

 From east to west

 Princes Street
 Nelson Street
 Scott Street

References 

Streets in Perth, Scotland
19th-century establishments in Scotland